M. O. H. F. Shahjahan is an Indian politician. He is a member of the Indian National Congress in the Union Territory of Puducherry. He won the 2016 Puducherry Legislative Assembly election from Kalapet constituency by a narrow margin of 500 votes over All India N.R Congress' candidate P.M.L. Kalyanasundram who had earlier defeated him in the 2011 Puducherry Legislative Assembly election in the same constituency. He has been a Revenue, transport, IT, minority affairs minister in the Government of Puducherry. He represented Lawspet constituency between 2001 and 2011 and Kalapet constituency from 2016 to 2021. He is also the son of M. O. H. Farook who was former Chief Minister of Pondicherry.

He contested the Kamaraj Nagar Constituency in 2021 and lost to Johnkumar of BJP.

References 

1964 births
Indian Muslims
Puducherry politicians
Indian National Congress politicians from Puducherry
State cabinet ministers of Puducherry
Living people
People from Karaikal
Puducherry MLAs 2016–2021
Puducherry MLAs 2001–2006
Puducherry MLAs 2006–2011